Attacks against seminary and institute buildings, historic sites, missionary training centers, meetinghouses and temples of the Church of Jesus Christ of Latter-day Saints in the United States and other countries have taken the form of arson, vandalism, and armed attacks. This timeline documents acts of violence and major vandalism against such Latter-day Saint places of worship, historical sites, training centers, and administrative properties, including an ongoing series of arson attacks beginning in 2018.

19th century

1830-1900 
1848 October – The Nauvoo Temple in Nauvoo, Illinois was destroyed in an act of arson.
1850 September 15 – In Spalding, England, a mob assaulted and overpowered a Church member who was guarding entry to a meetinghouse in use by fellow Latter-day Saints, compelling him inside; the mob then attacked the building and forced entry thereinto. On leaving the town that evening, Latter-day Saints from this congregation were later physically attacked by members of this mob.
1857 July 29 – Church members were attacked in a meetinghouse by locals in Birmingham, England; windows were destroyed, door hinges were torn off, and a door to the building was temporarily stolen.
1857 October 11 – Church members and their meetinghouse were physically attacked by locals in Bristol, England.
1858 July 20 – Church members were attacked in a meetinghouse by locals in Whitechapel, England; windows were destroyed, Latter-day Saints were physically assaulted with gravel and dirt and verbally abused as well.
1884 August 10 – A home being used as a meetinghouse in Lewis County, Tennessee was attacked by ten to twelve masked men, who shot and killed four Church members in cold blood. The event is known today as Tennessee's Mormon Massacre.

20th century

1901-2000 
1901 August 8 – A meetinghouse in Davis Chapel (now known as Hale Spring) in Marshall County, Kentucky was burned to the ground.
1902 June 16 – A meetinghouse was attacked in Davis Chapel (now known as Hale Spring) in Marshall County, Kentucky, resulting in one Church convert being wounded in the leg by gunshot.
1904 – Residents of Harker's Island, North Carolina threw rocks and shot a bullet at a meetinghouse.
1906 January 16 – A meetinghouse in Harker's Island, North Carolina was burned to the ground by arsonists.
1912 November 18 – A meetinghouse was attacked by a mob of 300 people in Bristol, England during Church services.
1962 November 14 – The Salt Lake Temple was bombed with a plastic explosive, shattering one of its doors and eleven of its windows.
1963 April 1 – A meetinghouse under construction in Porto Alegre, Brazil was bombed.
1970 December 16 – A meetinghouse in Hayward, California was damaged in an act of arson, resulting in $200,000 dollars in damages.
1973 November 7 – A meetinghouse in Scottsdale, Arizona was damaged in an act of arson.
1980 February 20 – A meetinghouse in Tooele, Utah was damaged by a bomb in its parking lot, causing about $5,000 dollars in damages.
1980 May – A stake center that had not yet been completed was destroyed in an act of arson in Cody, Wyoming.
1983 October 3 – A meetinghouse in Lancaster, Pennsylvania was damaged in an act of arson related to a burglary, resulting in $25,000 dollars in damages.
1984 January – A meetinghouse in Marlboro, Massachusetts was totally destroyed in an act of arson just shortly after it had been built, resulting in $500,000 dollars worth of damages.
1985 July 4 – Two meetinghouses in Concepción, Chile were bombed; meetinghouses in Lota, Chile and Coronel, Chile suffered minor damage from bombs around the same time.
1986 April 22/23 – Five meetinghouses in Santiago, Chile were bombed.
1986 October 23 – Clarence Leake took two hostages inside the Washington D.C. Temple in Kensington, Maryland during a 12-hour standoff with police.
 1988 January 16 – A meetinghouse in Marion, Utah was bombed.
1988 July 5/6 – A meetinghouse in Salt Lake City, Utah was vandalized.
1989 July 4 – Seven masked assailants entered a meetinghouse in the La Florida district of Santiago, Chile, forced a missionary at gunpoint to undress, then threw a firebomb into the meetinghouse library.
1989 July 10 – A meetinghouse in Santa Cruz, Bolivia was bombed.
1989 September 6 – A meetinghouse in Santiago, Chile was bombed.
1989 December 24 – Meetinghouses in Santiago, Chile and other Chilean cities were bombed.
1989 December 26 – Two meetinghouses in Chiclayo, Peru were bombed.
1989 December 27 – A meetinghouse in Quilpué, Chile was bombed.
1989 December 29 – The Lima Peru Temple in Lima, Peru was attacked with dynamite.
1990 January 2 – The Omar-Torrijos Anti-Intervention Command group firebombed a meetinghouse in Caracas, Venezuela.
1990 October 5 – A meetinghouse was bombed in the La Florida district of Santiago, Chile.
1990 November 27 – A meetinghouse in Taylorsville, Utah was damaged in arson during a volleyball tournament inside consisting of about 150 players and spectators; the meetinghouse was evacuated. Nobody is reported to have died; about $1,500 worth of damages was caused.
1990 December 6 – Four meetinghouses were bombed in Santiago, Chile.
1991 January 20 – A meetinghouse in Rio de Janeiro, Brazil was damaged in an attack with two bombs.
1991 January 22 – A meetinghouse in Phoenix, Arizona was damaged in an act of arson, resulting in about $20,000 dollars worth of damages.
1991 February 13 – A meetinghouse in the Maipu district of Santiago, Chile was bombed, suffering minor damage.
1991 April 14 – A meetinghouse in Provo, Utah was bombed.
1991 July 7 – A meetinghouse in Chile was bombed.
1991 July 20 – A meetinghouse and family history centre in Loughborough, Leistershire, England was damaged in an act of arson.
1991 December 22 – Six bombs were set off in Chile: five in Santiago and one in Valdivia; two of the targeted sites were meetinghouses of the Church.
1992 March 29 – A meetinghouse was bombed in Santiago, Chile.
1992 July 21 – A meetinghouse was bombed in Temuco, Chile.
1992 July 27 – A meetinghouse was bombed in Santiago, Chile.
1992 November 2 – A meetinghouse in Butte, Montana was damaged in an act of arson.
1993 February 7 – During an address by Howard W. Hunter (then the President of the LDS Church's Quorum of the Twelve Apostles) at the Marriott Center at Brigham Young University (owned by the LDS Church) in Provo, Utah, Cody Robert Judy entered the center and threatened Hunter directly with the detonation of a bomb (which was later found to be fake).
1993 February 20 – A meetinghouse in Essex, Maryland was damaged in an act of arson, resulting in $3 million dollars worth of damages.
1993 July 24–25 – Nearly a dozen meetinghouses in Davis County, Utah were vandalized over the course of a weekend; locks were glued, windows were smashed, and some vehicles were also damaged. The meetinghouses were located in Farmington, Kaysville, Layton, Clinton, and Clearfield.
1997 Spring – A meetinghouse in Abbotsford, British Columbia was burned in an act of arson.
1997 March 14 – A meetinghouse in South Jordan, Utah was burned in an act of arson; its organ was destroyed in the fire.
1998 June 28 – A meetinghouse in Roswell, New Mexico was burned in an act of arson, resulting in $2.5 million dollars in damages.
2000 January 3 – A meetinghouse and Seminary building in Sandy, Utah was damaged in an act of arson.

21st century

2001-2010 

2001 January 20/21 – A meetinghouse in Gig Harbor, Washington was vandalized, resulting in damages around $40,000 to $50,000.
2001 May 25 – A meetinghouse in Sandy, Utah was vandalized, resulting in at least $100,000 worth of damages.
2001 June 12 – A meetinghouse in West Valley City, Utah was burned in an act of arson, resulting in $300,000 worth of damages.
2001 June 22 – A meetinghouse in Salt Lake City, Utah was vandalized.
2001 July 3 – A meetinghouse in Lexington, Ohio was burned in an act of arson.
2001 July 22 – A meetinghouse in Nephi, Utah was vandalized with graffiti.
2002 June 30 – A meetinghouse in Lansing, Michigan was leveled due to an act of arson, resulting in approximately $5 million worth of damages.
2003 April 6 – A meetinghouse in Murray, Utah was burned in an act of arson, resulting in damages worth less than $5,000.
2003 August 2 – A meetinghouse in Kearns, Utah was burned in an act of arson; the man responsible for the arson also stole a Church checkbook from the building, which led to his capture.
2004 June 24 – A meetinghouse's trees were destroyed in Riverton, Utah, resulting in approximately $10,000 worth of damages.
2004 December 11 – A man armed with an ax damaged a Christus statue at the visitor's center of the Oakland California Temple.
2004 December 29 – A meetinghouse in Sandy, Utah was vandalized with derogatory remarks towards homosexuals, blacks, and members of the Church spray-painted; this resulted in several thousand dollars' worth of damages.
2005 February 27 – A meetinghouse in Rose, Idaho was burned by arsonists who piled up charred furniture at the front entrance and set the structure a fire.
 2006 July 28 – A meetinghouse in Springville, Utah was burned in an act of arson.
 2007 November 19 – A meetinghouse in Mesa, Arizona was burned.
2008 January 14 – A seminary building in Salt Lake City, Utah was vandalized with graffiti.
2008 February 15 – A seminary building in Farmington, New Mexico was damaged in an act of arson.
2008 November 13 – An envelope containing white powder was sent to and opened in the Salt Lake Temple; around the same time, similar substances were sent to the Los Angeles California Temple and to a Catholic fraternity. The substances were later found not to be hazardous.
2008 November 24 – A meetinghouse in Farmington, Utah was damaged in an act of vandalism.
2009 September 7/8 – A meetinghouse in the Sellwood area of Portland, Oregon was vandalized, resulting in thousands of dollars' worth of damage.
2010 August 29 – A bishop was shot and killed in his office at one of the Church's meetinghouses in Visalia, California.
 2010 October 17 – A meetinghouse in Mukilteo, Washington was burned.
2010 October 30 – Two meetinghouses in Salt Lake City, Utah were burned in acts of arson.
2010 December 7 – A gunman threatened the safety of visitors at the Oquirrh Mountain Utah Temple grounds.

2011-2020 
 2011 December 16 – A meetinghouse in Santaquin, Utah was burned.
 2012 June 9 – Two meetinghouses in Logan, Utah (as well as nine other buildings pertaining to other religions/churches) were damaged in an act of vandalism.
 2012 June 29 – A fire that destroyed a 50-year-old meetinghouse in Tolleson, Arizona was confirmed to be the work of an arsonist.
2012 June 30/July 1 – A meetinghouse in Cedar City, Utah was vandalized, resulting in tens of thousands of dollars in damage.
 2012 September 25 – A meetinghouse in Spokane, Washington was burned in an act of arson.
2013 May 5 – A failed Molotov cocktail was thrown through the window of a meetinghouse in Ogden, Utah; the remains of the incendiary device still caused approximately $1,000 dollars in damage.
 2013 May 13 – A meetinghouse in Magna, Utah was burned in an act of arson.
2013 November 7 – Three meetinghouses in Chubbuck, Idaho were damaged in acts of vandalism, with obscenities and antagonistic slurs painted thereon.
2014 July 15 – A meetinghouse in Frenchtown, Montana was damaged in an act of vandalism.
2014 October 15 – Two men and a male minor broke in and vandalized a meetinghouse in Duchesne, Utah; they also stole various items and about $500 dollars of tithing money.
2015 July 14 – A week after a meetinghouse in the Glassell Park area of Los Angeles, California was burned due to a brush fire, a local gang defaced the remains of the building with graffiti.
2015 August 23 – The construction site of the Fort Collins Colorado Temple was damaged in an act of vandalism.
2016 March 25/26 – The construction site of the Meridian Idaho Temple was vandalized.
 2016 April 9 – A meetinghouse in Vancouver, Washington was burned and vandalized.
 2016 July 26 – A meetinghouse in Las Vegas, Nevada was burned in an act of arson. A firefighter's union hall across the street was also targeted.
 2016 November 12 – The outbuilding of a meetinghouse in Rexburg, Idaho was vandalized with spray paint.
 2016 December 10 – A meetinghouse in Guelph, Ontario was damaged in an act of vandalism.
 2017 March 1 – A meetinghouse in the Van Nuys neighborhood of Los Angeles, California was heavily damaged by fire, and investigation could not determine the cause.
2017 October 18/19 – A meetinghouse in Dublin, Ohio was vandalized.
2018 January 9 – A meetinghouse in Twin Falls, Idaho was vandalized with graffiti.
2018 May 12 – A man broke into the St. George Utah Temple, broke its windows, attacked some of its temple workers, and smeared blood through an area of the temple.
2018 July 14/15 – A meetinghouse in Millcreek, Utah was vandalized.
2018 July 22 – A gunman entered a meetinghouse in Fallon, Nevada, killing one person and injuring another.
2018 August 26/27 – The interior of a meetinghouse in Spanish Fork, Utah was vandalized, resulting in $5,000 worth of damages.
2018 November 17 – A teenager assaulted and strangled a 70-year-old female organist who was rehearsing on the organ at a meetinghouse in Centerville, Utah; the attacker is believed to have gained entry to the meetinghouse by throwing a rock through one of its windows.
 2018 December 2 – Five people were injured in a mass knife attack at a meetinghouse in Goiânia, Brazil.
 2018 December 4 – A couch was set on fire in an attempt to burn down a meetinghouse in Fort Collins, Colorado.
2019 January 26 – A meetinghouse in St. George, Utah was burned down in an act of arson. An Episcopal church was also targeted.
 2019 March 13 – Two meetinghouses in Greymouth and Christchurch, New Zealand, were burned in acts of arson.
 2019 March 29 – Two meetinghouses in Orem, Utah were burned and defaced with the words "Satan Lives".
2019 March 29 – A meetinghouse in Concepción, Chile was attacked and burned via Molotov cocktail.
2019 April 7 – A meetinghouse in Tejupilco de Hidalgo, México State was burned in an act of arson; a Catholic church was also burned.
2019 May 15 – A meetinghouse in Boise, Idaho was vandalized, one of its windowpanes being damaged.
2019 May 18/19 – A meetinghouse and its fence in Provo, Utah were vandalized with graffiti with hateful religious and political speech.
 2019 June 1 – A meetinghouse in Boise, Idaho was broken into, with some of its glass being broken.
2019 June 1 – A meetinghouse in Farmington, New Mexico was burned in an act of arson.
2019 June 21 – A meetinghouse in Cedar City, Utah was vandalized, causing thousands of dollars' worth of damage.
 2019 June 28 – A meetinghouse in Ogden, Utah was burned in an act of arson.
 2019 July 6 – The roof of a meetinghouse in Boise, Idaho was vandalized with spray paint.
 2019 July 6 – The exterior walls of a meetinghouse in Shoreline, Washington was vandalized with spray paint.
2019 July 10 – An outside wall of a meetinghouse in Boise, Idaho was vandalized with graffiti.
2019 July 14 – A meetinghouse in Cottonwood Heights, Utah was burned in an act of arson.
 2019 July 21 – An intruder attempted to set fire in a bathroom of a meetinghouse in Boise, Idaho.
2019 July 21 – Two seminary buildings in Herriman, Utah were vandalized with racist graffiti.
 2019 July 23 – A gunman fired his weapon at a group of individuals at a meetinghouse parking lot in St. George, Utah.
2019 August 12 – An intentional fire was set in a meetinghouse in Layton, Utah.
 2019 August 16 – A meetinghouse in Logandale, Nevada was targeted in an act of attempted arson.
2019 October 11/12 – A meetinghouse in Boise, Idaho was vandalized.
2019 December 24 – A man broke into and vandalized the Logan Utah Temple.
2020 January 9 – Joshua Adams Hale pled guilty to willfully and maliciously set fire to and burned the chapel of the Church of Jesus Christ of Latter-day Saints in Cherry Creek, South Dakota.
 2020 February 5 – A missionary training center in São Paolo, Brazil was infiltrated by an intruder armed with a knife; the intruder was shot and killed by police.
2020 May 26 – Honolulu police launched an arson investigation involving an early morning church fire in Kalaeloa, Hawaii that investigators determined was intentionally set.
2020 August 3 – A gunman fired shots at the Church's missionary training center in Provo, Utah.
 2020 September 7 – A meetinghouse in Eagle Mountain, Utah was vandalized and partially burned.
2020 November 12 – A meetinghouse was vandalized in Moab, Utah.

2021-Present 

2021 January 17 – Randy Louis White, 35, of Sacramento admitted to breaking the window of a meetinghouse in Willows, California, entering the building and purposely starting fire to the building.
2021 February 25 – A meetinghouse in Provo, Utah was damaged in an act of arson.
 2021 April 18 – A meetinghouse in Cape Girardeau, Missouri was burned down in an act of arson.
2021 April 26 – A meetinghouse in Fruita, Colorado was burned down in an act of arson.
2021 June 15 – A meetinghouse in West Jordan, Utah was vandalized, resulting in $50,000 worth of damage.
2021 August 31 – Three meetinghouses in St. George, Utah were damaged in acts of arson.
2021 October 9 – A meetinghouse in Syracuse, Utah was damaged in acts of arson and vandalism.
2021 November 12 – Two men carrying firearms entered a meetinghouse in Torreón, Coahuila during a zone conference among the missionaries of the Church in that area. There were 70 missionaries (57 elders, 13 sisters) in attendance along with the mission president and his wife. The two men demanded cell phones, tablets, and wallets, assaulting some of the missionaries in the process; the mission president and his wife were also assaulted and threatened with a knife.
2021 November 7 – The Brigham Young Family Cemetery, a historical site owned by the Church, was damaged in acts of vandalism.
2021 December 2 – A monument at the Mormon Battalion Historic Site in Presidio Park in San Diego, California was vandalized.
2021 December 4 – A missionary was shot five times in a meetinghouse in Birmingham, Alabama.
2021 December 28 or 29 – $30,000 dollars in property damage occurred during a break-in at a meetinghouse in Kirtland, New Mexico.
2022 January 2 – A meetinghouse's windows were damaged in an act of vandalism in Park City, Utah.
2022 March 27 – Windows of the Brigham Young Winter Home and Office (a historic site/museum of the Church) in St George, UT were broken in an act of vandalism, resulting in approximately $4,000 dollars in damage.
2022 April 28 – The roof of a meetinghouse in Modesto, California was intentionally but minimally damaged in an act of vandalism.
2022 May 21 – A pro-abortion group vandalized a meetinghouse in Olympia, Washington as well as the buildings of three other faiths in the area.
2022 June 29 – A meetinghouse was vandalized in Monroe, Utah with graffiti.
2022 July 20 – Fourteen meetinghouses were vandalized in St. George, Utah, in Hurricane, Utah, and in Washington, Utah by a group of three individuals.
2022 July 25 – The Orem Utah Temple was damaged in an act of arson while it was being built.
2022 August 2 – A meetinghouse was damaged in an act of arson in Boise, Idaho.
2022 August 16 – Several meetinghouses were damaged in acts of vandalism in Sandy, Utah and in Draper, Utah.
2022 October 14 – A meetinghouse in Pocatello, Idaho was damaged in an act of vandalism.
2022 November 13 – A meetinghouse in Perry, Utah was damaged in an act of vandalism; it is estimated that thousands of dollars' worth of damage was done.
2022 November 18 – The Logan Tabernacle in Logan, Utah was damaged in an act of vandalism.
2022 November 25 – A meetinghouse in Saanich, British Columbia was damaged in an act of arson.
2023 January 11 – A Molotov cocktail was thrown at the LDS Conference Center in Salt Lake City, Utah.
2023 February 12 – A meetinghouse in Elko, Nevada was damaged during a break-in, wherein two fires were set.
2023 February 24 - Two missionaries were assaulted in Cali, Colombia. Only one of them was stabbed in the neck.

References 

Churches